Holywell is a neighbourhood near Swords, Dublin, Ireland.  Developed and marketed in phases and under various names, Feltrim Hall, Gorse Hill, Abbey Stone, Holywell and The Meadows, all the street names in the community include the common name Holywell e.g. 'Holywell Drive'. It is the eastern part of the census town of Kinsealy–Drinan, separated from the western part by the M1 motorway.

History
Founded in 2004, the community grew rapidly over its first four years. The development of social and recreational facilities initially lagged behind the development of housing in the community, however developments since 2008 saw the completion of a small commercial centre, a primary school, large community centre, crèche, two tennis courts and football/rugby pitches, and two modern playgrounds. In 2017, a retail park was constructed adjacent to the estate with a large Tesco store, pharmacy, café, and medical centre.

The name is related to a "Holy Well" which is located near to the community although not on the actual site.

Location
Holywell is located to the south east of Swords, on the west side of the Dublin to Belfast M1 Motorway, the Swords junction off the M1 serves the estate and also provide a link to the Airside Retail Park and on to Swords.

The centre of Swords is a 20 to 25 minute walk from Holywell estate.

Public transport

Holywell is adjacent to the M1 motorway and has benefited from reasonable access to Dublin city centre because of this. The Swords Express and Dublin Bus routes 41x and 142 stop on the R125 Dual Carriageway, which divides Holywell into north and south.

The Swords Express bus service serves Holywell. During peak times it is a 25-minute journey between Holywell and Dublin City Centre, operating via the M1 motorway and Dublin Port Tunnel.

At peak times, Holywell is also served by Dublin Bus routes 41x and 142. Route 41x operates from Swords Manor to UCD Belfield via Holywell, Dublin Port Tunnel and Dublin City Centre. It serves Holywell in the morning peak only. Route 142 operates from Portmarnock to Rathmines/UCD via Malahide, Holywell, Dublin Port Tunnel and Dublin City Centre.

Dublin Bus route 43 and Go-Ahead Ireland route 102 also stop nearby on Montgorry Way. The 43 bus operates between Swords and Dublin City Centre, via Drynam, Kinsealy, the Malahide Road, Artane and Fairview. Route 102 operates from Dublin Airport to Sutton via Swords, Drynam, Malahide and Portmarnock.

References

External links
Holywell Educate Together National School

Neighbourhoods in Swords, Dublin